Moltke is a lunar impact crater near the southern edge of the Mare Tranquillitatis. It is a small, bowl-shaped crater surrounded by a bright halo of higher-albedo material. Just to the south lies the rille system named Rimae Hypatia. These follow a course running roughly east-southeast to west-northwest, and have a length of approximately 180 kilometers.

About 50 kilometers to the northwest of this crater is the landing site of Apollo 11.

The crater is named after German army general and author Helmuth von Moltke the Elder.

Satellite craters
By convention these features are identified on lunar maps by placing the letter on the side of the crater midpoint that is closest to Moltke.

Moltke B was informally called Little Moltke by the Apollo 10 and Apollo 11 crews.

References

External links
 Impact Melt Boundary within Moltke, from LROC
 Lunar Orbiter 3 Frame 072, very high resolution view of east rim of Moltke
 Lunar Orbiter 5 Frame 071, high resolution view of Moltke and Apollo 11 landing site

Impact craters on the Moon